is a Japanese former Nippon Professional Baseball pitcher.

External links

Living people
1978 births
Baseball people from Ishikawa Prefecture
Keio University alumni
Japanese baseball players
Nippon Professional Baseball pitchers
Osaka Kintetsu Buffaloes players
Orix Buffaloes players
Yokohama BayStars players
Yokohama DeNA BayStars players
Fukuoka SoftBank Hawks players